Hebi (postal: Hopi) is a prefecture-level city in northern Henan province, China.

As of the 2020 census, its population was 1,565,973 inhabitants and in the 2018 estimate 574,000 lived in the built-up (or metro) area made of Qibin District and Qi County largely conurbated. One can notice that Shancheng District and Heshan District are for the moment, part of another built-up area of 372,600 inhabitants close to Anyang.

Hebi has several coal mines. The city is also home to Hebi New Area, an economic development zone.

Administration
The prefecture-level city of Hebi administers 3 districts and 2 counties.

Qibin District
Shancheng District
Heshan District
Xun County
Qi County

Climate

History 
The name of "Hebi" first appears in book "History of Jin". It is believed that during ancient times, cranes would rest on the cliffs of the southern mountains. The southern mountain was then named 鹤山(HeShan), where 鹤 means crane. The villiage near the southern mountain was then named 鹤壁(Hebi), which literally translates to "Cranes resting on cliffs").

Relocation of the Urban Area of Hebi 
The urban area of Hebi has undergone three relocations. In 1957, the urban area was selected to be in Hebiji. With the construction of the mine #2 and mine #3, the urban area moved south to what is now known as Zhongshan District in December 1957. Later in 1959, the urban area changed from Zhongshan District to another district that is known as Dahu. However, the surrounding areas of the urban area became mostly subsidence areas, restricting further development of the city. Therefore, in 1992, Hebi government established Qibin Economic Development Zone at the junction of Qi County, Junxian County in the southeast. As the scale of the Qibin Economic Development Zone expands, the political center of the city also moved to Qibin District in May of 1999. Qibin District is now the new political, economic center of Hebi City.

References

External links
Government website of Hebi (in Simplified Chinese)

 
Cities in Henan
Prefecture-level divisions of Henan